Chivez Smith (born October 31, 1989), known professionally as Icewear Vezzo, is an American rapper from Detroit, Michigan. Signed to record labels Motown and Quality Control, he is known for his Clarity mixtape series and his Rich Off Pints mixtape trilogy, with the latter entering the Heatseekers Albums chart. He is noted as a prominent figure of the Detroit hip hop scene.

Early Life 

Chivez Smith was born and raised in the Gratiot-Findlay neighborhood on Sanford Ave & Bradford Ave on the east side of Detroit, Michigan

Career beginnings 
Smith began his career as a member of the rap group Green Guyz, founded in Minnesota by his close relatives and siblings.

Solo career

2012–2018: The Clarity series and Motown 
In 2012, he started gaining traction with the release of his debut solo mixtape The Clarity. In 2013, he released his second mixtape The Clarity 2: Can't Stop the Count the sequel to The Clarity.  In 2014, he released his third Clarity mixtape The Clarity 3: Fully Blown, which reached number 48 on the Heatseekers Albums chart. In 2015, he released his fourth Clarity mixtape Clarity 4: I Can't Fall Off which featured the single "Moon Walken". In 2016, he released the full-length mixtape Moon Walken.  In November 2018, Vezzo was signed to the record label Motown. In December 2018, he released his Clarity 6 under Motown, featuring Kash Doll. In February 2019, Vezzo released his debut single under Motown, "Balance" featuring rapper Big Sean.

2021–2022: Rich Off Pints series and Quality Control 
In April 2021, he released his single "Up the Sco" with a feature from Lil Durk. In May 2021, he released his project High Off Pints featuring guest appearances by Rio da Yung OG, Peezy, Louie Ray, Trippie Redd, Lil Yachty, EST Gee, Dreezy, BIG 30, and others. In June 2021, the album debuted at number seven on the Heatseekers Albums chart. In September 2021, Vezzo released his project Rich Off Pints 2 the sequel to Rich Off Pints with appearances from Rio da Yung OG, Antt Beatz, Babyface Ray, Future, Moneybagg Yo, and RMR. Rich Off Pints 2 debuted atop the Heatseekers Albums chart and peaked at number 34 on the Independent Albums chart. In July 2022, Vezzo released Rich Off Pints 3, which is the fourth and final installment in his Rich Off Pints mixtape trilogy. The mixtape includes performances by Lil Durk, Lil Baby, G Herbo, E-40, Key Glock, Baby Money and Antt Beatz. In August 2022, debuted at number three on the Heatseekers Albums chart. Also in August 2022, Vezzo signed a deal with Quality Control Music and released his track "It's All On U" with rapper Kodak Black.

2022–present: Paint the City 
In December 2022, he released his song "One Time" featuring rapper Jeezy. On December 8, 2022, Vezzo released his Gangsta Grillz mixtape Paint the City with appearances from Kodak Black, Jeezy, Future, 2 Chainz, Peezy, and G.T.

Other ventures

Iced Up 
Iced Up Records is a record label founded by Vezzo. The label has its own film production company Iced Up Films; its first film was Price of Love.

Chicken Talk 
In July 2015, Vezzo opened a restaurant called Chicken Talk.

Discography 
The Clarity (2012)
The Clarity 2 (2013)
The City Is Mine (2013)
The Clarity 3: Fully Blown (2014)
Solitaires: Drank God (2014)
Clarity 4: I Can't Fall Off (2015)
Moon Walking (2016)
Purple City [with Antt Beatz] (2016)
Price Goin Up (2017)
Clarity 6 (2018)
Robbin Season (2019)
Drank Baby (2020)
Robbin Season 2 (2020)
Rich Off Pints (2021)
Rich Off Pints 2 (2021)
Rich Off Pints 3 (2022)
Paint the City [with DJ Drama] (2022)

References

External links 
 
 

1989 births
Living people
21st-century American businesspeople
21st-century American male singers
21st-century American singers
21st-century American rappers
American hip hop singers
American male rappers
American male singer-songwriters
Businesspeople from Detroit
Hardcore hip hop artists
Midwest hip hop musicians
Motown artists
Quality Control artists
Rappers from Detroit
Singers from Detroit
Singer-songwriters from Michigan
Underground rappers